The 1902 Columbia Blue and White football team was an American football team that represented Columbia University as an independent during the 1902 college football season.  In its first season under head coach Bill Morley, the team compiled a 6–4–1 record and outscored opponents by a total of  including six shutouts.

Halfback Harold Weekes was the team captain.  He also received second-team honors from Caspar Whitney on the 1902 All-America team.

Columbia's sports teams were commonly called the "Blue and White" in this era, but had no official nickname. The name "Lions" would not be adopted until 1910.

The team played its seven home games at the Polo Grounds in Upper Manhattan.

Schedule

References

Columbia
Columbia Lions football seasons
Columbia Blue and White football